Star Lake is a future light rail station in southwestern Kent, Washington, United States. It is part of the Link light rail system, operated by Sound Transit, and is being constructed for the Federal Way Link Extension. The station will be located at the existing Star Lake Park and Ride, adjacent to the intersection of Interstate 5 and South 272nd Street.

Construction of the station was originally approved by voters in the 2008 Sound Transit 2 ballot measure, but deferred two years later after a funding shortfall. The Sound Transit 3 ballot measure, passed in 2016, re-instated funding and approval for the station, as well as an extension to Federal Way Transit Center. The extension is scheduled to open in 2025.

History

Star Lake station is planned to be a retained cut structure attached to a 1,240-stall parking garage near the intersection of Interstate 5 and South 272nd Street. The existing park-and-ride at the site, opened in January 1981 by Metro Transit, closed on March 22, 2020, to prepare for light rail construction on the site.

An alternative option that was not chosen as the preferred route in July 2015 would have placed the station at the intersection of State Route 99 and South 272nd Street, closer to the Redondo neighborhood in Des Moines.

The station's location was finalized in January 2017, after negotiations with Federal Way Public Schools over the impacts to an elementary school on the south side of South 272nd Street. The school district will construct a new elementary school at the Redondo Park and Ride on State Route 99, while the current site can be used for light rail construction.

In 2022, the station was officially named for Star Lake, replacing its working name of South 272nd Street.

References

External links
Federal Way Link Extension

Future Link light rail stations
Federal Way, Washington
Link light rail stations in King County, Washington
Railway stations scheduled to open in 2025